Walter Edward Bardgett (25 September 1932 – 19 October 2020) was a Bermudian swimmer. He competed at the 1948 Summer Olympics and the 1952 Summer Olympics.

References

1932 births
2020 deaths
Bermudian male swimmers
Olympic swimmers of Bermuda
Swimmers at the 1948 Summer Olympics
Swimmers at the 1952 Summer Olympics
People from Paget Parish